Florence Crittendon Home may refer to:

Florence Crittenton Home (Little Rock, Arkansas), listed on the NRHP in Arkansas 
Florence Crittenton Home and Maternity Hospital, Sioux City, IA, listed on the NRHP in Iowa
Florence Crittenton Home (Charleston, South Carolina), listed on the NRHP in South Carolina 
National Florence Crittenton Mission, the organization which established as many as 75 Florence Crittenton Homes
The National Crittenton Foundation, the current name and form of the organization which established the Homes